A Berlese funnel, also known as Tullgren funnel, Berlese trap, or Berlese-Tullgren funnel, is an apparatus used to extract living organisms, particularly arthropods, from samples of soil. The Tullgren funnel works by creating a desiccation gradient over the sample such that mobile organisms will move away from the dry environment and fall into a collecting vessel, where they perish and are preserved for examination.  The illustration shows how it works: a funnel (E) contains the soil or litter (D), and a heat source (F) such as an electric lamp (G) heats the litter. Animals escaping from the desiccation of the litter descend through a filter (C) into a preservative liquid (A) in a receptacle (B). This illustration is merely a schematic, since usually the soil sample will not be crumbled and poured into the funnel (this would inevitably lead to a high amount of soil particles in the preservation fluid requiring laborious work to sort out the soil organisms). In fact, the soil sample is placed on a mesh sieve that will allow the soil animals to pass but should retain most of the soil particles.

This type of extraction is commonly referred to as Berlese funnel or Tullgren funnel. Antonio Berlese described this method of dynamic sampling in 1905 with a hot water jacket as heat source. In 1918 Albert Tullgren described a modification, where the heating came from above by an electric bulb and the heat gradient was increased by an iron sheet drum around the soil sample. Today's extraction funnels of this type usually combine elements from both publications and thus should be referred to as Berlese-Tullgren funnel.

A variation of the Berlese funnel uses naphthalene flakes or similar aromatic mothballs in place of the heat source to drive organisms downward. This method finds application in situations without electrical power, where the organisms are repulsed by volatile preservatives in collection container, or they cannot migrate downward quickly enough to avoid desiccation.

See also
Insect collecting
Soil biology

References

Further reading

Entomology equipment
Environmental Sampling Equipment